Millbrook railway station was an intermediate stop on the Jersey Railway, a mixed passenger and freight railway line on Jersey in the Channel Islands.

Station history
Millbrook station opened in 1870 when the railway first began operations. The standard gauge line was relaid to narrow gauge in 1884. In 1912 the station site was slightly relocated owing to a road widening scheme, and the new facility was built with two platforms, each having buildings, and connected by a footbridge. The track plan included a passing loop and a short siding. The station remained operational throughout the life of the Jersey Railway, and was closed when the line ceased operations in 1936.

Current use

The platforms, footbridge, and the smaller station building (on the seaward platform) have all been demolished. However, the principal station building, located on the landward platform, has survived, and is currently in use as a cafeteria. Part of the platform has been restored, and extended using decking, and the cafeteria is themed around its former railway use. The main building contains a small display of railway photographs and memorabilia, whilst replica station nameboards have been fixed to the exterior of the building.

References

Transport in Jersey
History of Jersey
Disused railway stations in the Channel Islands